Sim Kwon-Ho (Hangul: 심권호, Hanja: 沈權虎; born October 10, 1972, in Seongnam, South Korea) is a retired South Korean Greco Roman wrestler. He won gold medals at the 1996 and 2000 Olympic Games, and is the only South Korean wrestler to win two gold medals in the Olympics.

Career
Sim was born on October 10, 1972, in Seongnam, Gyeonggi-do, and started wrestling at the age of 13. While attending Seoul Physical Education High School in 1990, Sim was first selected for the South Korean national wrestling team.

Sim first gained attention at the 1993 World Wrestling Championships where he won the bronze medal in the 48 kg category. Next year, Sim won the gold medal in the Men's Greco-Roman 48 kg at the Asian Games. Since the 1994 Asian Games, Sim swept gold medals in the Greco-Roman light flyweight(48 kg) and flyweight(54 kg) categories never losing a match at major international competitions such as Olympic Games, World Championships, Asian Games and Asian Championships until his retirement in 2000.

1992 Olympic trials 
While trying to earn his spot to compete for the 1992 Summer Olympics, in Barcelona, Sim was ranked first in the Men's Greco-Roman 48 kg at the South Korean national trials, beating 1991 World Champion Goun Duk-Yong. Amid controversy, however, Goun was selected by Korea Wrestling Federation over Sim in the 48 kg category at the Barcelona Games, despite being ranked lower in the trials. At the Barcelona Games Goun was eventually eliminated in Round 1.

1996 Olympics
At the Atlanta Games in 1996, Sim won his first Olympic title by defeating Aleksandr Pavlov of Belarus in the final. He scored two points with a chest-high roll-through with 42 seconds left in regulation time and then added two more points with another roll in overtime to score a 4–0 victory.

In November 1996 Sim became the last world light flyweight (48 kg) champion at the 1996 World Cup where the FILA's final international 48 kg class competitions were held, dominating all the opponents by technical fall including two-time World Champion Wilber Sánchez of Cuba.

2000 Olympics
Sim moved up in weight from 48 kg to 54 kg in 1997 when the new weight classes were established by FILA. In the semifinals of the Sydney Games in 2000, he defeated Kang Yong-Gyun of North Korea 10–0. At the Opening Ceremony, the North and South Koreans had marched together. In this spirit, before the medal matches, Sim gave advice to Kang about the man he would be facing in the bronze-medal match-Andriy Kalashnikov of Ukraine, while Kang gave Sim a scouting report on his opponent in the gold-medal match-Lázaro Rivas of Cuba. Both Koreans won, with Sim scoring early and often against Rivas and prevailing 8–0.

Post career
Sim is currently a wrestling commentator for SBS Sports and serving as an assistant coach for the KOMSCO wrestling team.

Notable final matches

|-  style="text-align:center; background:#e3e3e3;"
|  style="border-style:none none solid solid; "|Opponent
|  style="border-style:none none solid solid; "|Res.
|  style="border-style:none none solid solid; "|Class
|  style="border-style:none none solid solid; "|Score
|  style="border-style:none none solid solid; "|Date
|  style="border-style:none none solid solid; "|Competition
|  style="border-style:none none solid solid; "|Notes
|- align=center
|Win||align=left| Lázaro Rivas
|rowspan=4|||  ||
|align=left| 
|align=left|
|- align=center
|Win||align=left| Shamseddin Khudoyberdiev
|| ||
|align=left| 
|align=left|
|- align=center
|Win||align=left| Kang Yong-Gyun
|| ||
|align=left| 
|align=left|
|- align=center
|Win||align=left| Marian Sandu
|| ||
|align=left| 
|align=left|
|- align=center
|Win||align=left| Aleksandr Pavlov
|rowspan=5|||  ||
|align=left| 
|align=left|
|- align=center
|Win||align=left| Kang Yong-Gyun
|| ||
|align=left| 
|align=left|
|- align=center
|Win||align=left| Hiroshi Kado
|| ||
|align=left| 
|align=left|
|- align=center
|Win||align=left| Dmitri Korshunov
|| ||
|align=left| 
|align=left|
|- align=center
|Win||align=left| Reza Simkhah
|| ||
|align=left| 
|align=left|

External links 
 Sim Kwon-Ho's highlights in the 1996 and 2000 Olympics from Youtube.com

Olympic wrestlers of South Korea
Wrestlers at the 1996 Summer Olympics
Wrestlers at the 2000 Summer Olympics
South Korean male sport wrestlers
Olympic gold medalists for South Korea
1972 births
Living people
Olympic medalists in wrestling
Asian Games medalists in wrestling
Wrestlers at the 1994 Asian Games
Wrestlers at the 1998 Asian Games
World Wrestling Championships medalists
Medalists at the 2000 Summer Olympics
Medalists at the 1996 Summer Olympics
Asian Games gold medalists for South Korea
Medalists at the 1994 Asian Games
Medalists at the 1998 Asian Games
Asian Wrestling Championships medalists
People from Seongnam
Sportspeople from Gyeonggi Province
20th-century South Korean people
21st-century South Korean people